Khural or Hural may refer to:

Great Khural of Tuva
State Great Khural of Mongolia
Little Khural of Mongolia
People's Khural of Buryatia
People's Khural of Kalmykia